Henry William Dalgliesh Cavill (born 5 May 1983) is a British actor. He is known for his portrayal of Charles Brandon in Showtime's The Tudors (2007–2010), DC Comics character Superman in the DC Extended Universe (2013–2022), Geralt of Rivia in the Netflix fantasy series The Witcher (2019–2023), and Sherlock Holmes in the Netflix film Enola Holmes (2020) and its 2022 sequel.

Cavill began his career with roles in the feature adaptations of The Count of Monte Cristo (2002) and I Capture the Castle (2003). He later portrayed supporting roles in several television series, including BBC's The Inspector Lynley Mysteries, ITV's Midsomer Murders, and Showtime's The Tudors. He has since appeared in other films, such as Tristan & Isolde (2006), Stardust (2007), and Immortals (2011). Following his international breakthrough as Superman, he has starred in the spy films The Man from U.N.C.L.E. (2015) and Mission: Impossible – Fallout (2018).

Early life
Cavill was born on 5 May 1983, the fourth of five boys in a Roman Catholic family in Saint Helier, Jersey, in the Channel Islands. His Jersey-born mother, Marianne Dalgliesh, is of Scottish, English and Irish heritage and worked as a secretary in a bank. His father, Colin Cavill, was born in Chester, England and is a former stockbroker. He was educated at St Michael's Preparatory School in Saint Saviour, Jersey, before attending Stowe School in Stowe, Buckinghamshire. 

At Stowe, Cavill was active in both sport and drama. He portrayed a member of the T-Birds in a 1999 school production of Grease and took the lead role in a performance of Dogg's Hamlet, which was made by his own Grafton house as their submission for an inter-school drama festival. He played field hockey for the 1st XI and rugby for the 3rd XV. 

In 2000, while playing rugby, 16-year-old Cavill met actor Russell Crowe, who was shooting on location at Stowe for the film Proof of Life. The actor shared some acting tips and later sent a package to Cavill. The two actors later worked together on Man of Steel.

Career
Cavill began his film career with a role in Laguna (2001) and Kevin Reynolds' adaptation of The Count of Monte Cristo (2002). He continued with appearances in BBC's The Inspector Lynley Mysteries (2002), the television film Goodbye, Mr. Chips (2002), and the television series Midsomer Murders (2003). In 2003, he had a supporting role in I Capture the Castle, followed by Hellraiser: Hellworld (2005), Red Riding Hood (2006) and Tristan & Isolde (2006). He had a minor role in Matthew Vaughn's adaptation of Stardust (2007).

From 2007 to 2010, Cavill had a leading role in Showtime's television series The Tudors, as Charles Brandon, 1st Duke of Suffolk. The series was commercially well-received and it went on to be nominated for a Golden Globe in 2007 and won an Emmy in 2008. Cavill gave the show credit for bolstering his career: "It's done the most for me to date. [...] Now that there's an audience somewhere in America that's aware of who I am, I have more sell-ability, because of The Tudors." Entertainment Weekly named him the "Most Dashing Duke" and praised his work on The Tudors for displaying "charm, depth and a killer bod".

Cavill had been set to play Superman in McG's 2004 film, Superman: Flyby. McG pulled out of the project and direction was taken over by director Bryan Singer, who recast Brandon Routh as the lead in Superman Returns. Cavill was also the cause of a write-in effort from fans to see him cast as Cedric Diggory in Harry Potter and the Goblet of Fire (2005). The role eventually went to Robert Pattinson. Stephenie Meyer, the author of the Twilight series, was outspoken in favour of Cavill playing the character of Edward Cullen in the Twilight film, calling him her "perfect Edward". However, by the time production of the film began, Cavill was too old to play the character, and again the role went to Pattinson. Despite reports that he was a contender for Batman in Batman Begins, Cavill confirmed that he never auditioned for, nor was offered, the role. 

In 2005, Cavill was a final choice for the role of James Bond in Casino Royale. The producers and director Martin Campbell were torn between him and Daniel Craig; reportedly Campbell supported Cavill but the producers preferred an older Bond. Craig ultimately landed the role. Fifteen years later in 2020, an artificial intelligence device chose Cavill as the optimal successor to Craig following Craig's retirement from the role following No Time to Die.

While appearing in The Tudors, Cavill starred in director Joel Schumacher's horror film, Blood Creek (2008), and had a supporting role in Woody Allen's comedy film Whatever Works (2009).  He went on to play the lead role of Theseus in Tarsem Singh's mythological film, Immortals, released 11 November 2011, and starred, alongside Bruce Willis, in The Cold Light of Day released in 2012.

On 30 January 2011, it was announced that Cavill had been cast in the role of Clark Kent / Superman in director Zack Snyder's Man of Steel. Snyder called Cavill "the perfect choice to don the cape and S shield." Entertainment media applauded Henry Cavill on his road to success. On being chosen for the role, Cavill commented, "In the pantheon of superheroes, Superman is the most recognized and revered character of all time, and I am honoured to be a part of his return to the big screen." Cavill reprised the role of Superman in Batman v Superman: Dawn of Justice, a 2016 sequel which featured a crossover with Batman and Wonder Woman. He attended the San Diego Comic-Con in disguise to surprise the cast of Suicide Squad.

Cavill returned as Superman in the 2017 theatrical version of Justice League, which had been reworked by director Joss Whedon after Snyder left the project due to a family tragedy. He appeared again in Zack Snyder's Justice League which premiered on HBO Max in March 2021 after an intense fan campaign to see the Snyder cut. His manager Dany Garcia said in 2016 that he was working on a new standalone Superman film. Directors Matthew Vaughn and Christopher McQuarrie were reportedly interested. Shortly after the release of Justice League, Cavill revealed he was under contract to play Superman in one more film.

In 2015, he co-starred with Armie Hammer in the film version of spy series The Man from U.N.C.L.E, directed by Guy Ritchie. In 2018, Cavill co-starred as August Walker in the action spy film Mission: Impossible – Fallout, the sixth installment of the film series. Later that year, he starred in the psychological thriller Night Hunter (originally titled Nomis). Cavill has expressed interest in taking over the role of James Bond after Daniel Craig leaves the role.

On 4 September 2018, it was announced that Cavill would be portraying the protagonist Geralt of Rivia in the Netflix adaptation of The Witcher. The series premiered on 20 December 2019. The series had its early premiere on Służewiec Racetrack in Warsaw on 18 December 2019.

On 27 June 2019, it was announced that Cavill would portray Sherlock Holmes in Legendary Entertainment's film adaptation of The Enola Holmes Mysteries, with Millie Bobby Brown in the eponymous role. On 13 May 2021, it was announced that he would reprise his role in Enola Holmes 2. On 21 May 2021, it was announced that Cavill would portray the lead role in the reboot of Highlander, although his exact character is unknown. On 8 July 2021, it was reported that Cavill would join an all-star cast for director Matthew Vaughn's new spy film Argylle. The same month, an article by Deadline confirmed that he would star in The Rosie Project, directed by Steve Falk and based on the book of the same name, written by Australian author Graeme Simsion.

Cavill negotiated what was intended to be a one-time contract with Warner Bros. to return as Superman in Black Adam, and appeared in a cameo in the mid-credit scene of the film. Later a sequel to Man of Steel was put back in development, with Cavill set to return. 
He confirmed in October 2022 that he would appear in future DCEU films and referred to his mid-credits cameo as "just a very small taste of things to come". However, in December 2022 Cavill released a statement saying that his future involvement as Superman was no longer moving forward after meeting with new DC Studios executives James Gunn and Peter Safran; Variety reported that Cavill is eyed to play a different DC character.

Cavill will reteam with director Guy Ritchie on the World War II spy film The Ministry of Ungentlemanly Warfare, with Jerry Bruckheimer producing. In late October 2022, Cavill and Netflix announced that he would exit from The Witcher after the third season, which would release in 2023, and will be replaced by Liam Hemsworth. 

After the acquisition of global rights to the Warhammer 40,000 franchise by Amazon Studios in December 2022, Cavill was attached to star in and executive produce projects related to it.

Public image
Cavill was listed as one of GQs 50 best-dressed British men in 2012. In December 2013, he was named "World's Sexiest Man" by British Glamour magazine. The same year, Empire magazine placed him third on their list of "The 100 Sexiest Movie Stars 2013".

In early 2008, Cavill became the face of the British fragrance Dunhill. He appeared in two television commercials for the brand.

Personal life
Cavill is described as British and English. He was born in the Crown Dependency of Jersey, an island in the Channel Islands. Cavill resides in South Kensington, London. He was engaged to English show jumper Ellen Whitaker from 2011 until 
2012.

In 2016, Cavill started practising Brazilian jiu-jitsu, having been seen training at Roger Gracie's academy in London. Cavill supports the Jersey Rugby Club.

He has been an avid gamer since childhood, at one point missing a phone call from Zack Snyder telling him he got the role of Superman because he was too busy playing World of Warcraft. He prefers PC gaming over consoles, having been introduced to it by his father when he was a young boy, and has been building and maintaining his own gaming computer. He credited his experience playing The Witcher video game series prior to the show's production with motivating him to seek out the role of Geralt. He has also named the Total War series of strategy games to be among his favourites, and in May 2020 it was announced that a new character paying tribute to Cavill and his Witcher character Geralt would be added to Total War: Warhammer 2 via DLC; Cavill, Loremaster of Hoeth. Cavill also enjoys the Warhammer 40,000 series of games and fiction, saying he "genuinely can't get enough of the lore they have built over the decades".

Cavill is a spokesman for the Durrell Wildlife Conservation Trust, and an ambassador for The Royal Marines Charity. He launched the running phase of the Royal Marines 1664 Challenge and took part in The Gibraltar Rock Run 2014.

Filmography

Film

Television

Video games

Awards and nominations

References

External links

 
 

1983 births
Living people
21st-century British male actors
British male film actors
British male television actors
British Roman Catholics
British expatriates in the United States
British people of English descent
British people of Irish descent
British people of Scottish descent
British practitioners of Brazilian jiu-jitsu
Jersey male actors
People educated at Stowe School
People from Saint Saviour, Jersey